Route 181 is a highway in southern Missouri.  Its southern terminus is at US 160 in Gainesville in Ozark County. It passes through eastern Douglas County and reaches its northern terminus at Business U.S. Route 60 in Cabool in Texas County.

Route description
Route 181 begins at an intersection with US 160 near Gainesville and heads northeast, intersecting Route 80. The route passes by Caney Mountain Conservation Area before passing through Zanoni and crossing over Pine Creek. It then passes through Sycamore, past the Hodgson Mill and continues northeast. It then heads due north through Dora in Ozark County and meets Route 14. The route then runs concurrent with Route 14 for  until meeting the twin bridges at the North Fork River and Spring Creek.The two bridges on Route 14 are separated by an 880-foot-wide (270 m) low point in a north–south trending ridge between the North Fork River and its tributary Spring Creek to the east. It then continues north until it approaches Cabool. It interchanges with US 60 before crossing over the Big Piney River and reaching its northern terminus at US 60 Business.

Major intersections

References

181
Transportation in Texas County, Missouri
Transportation in Douglas County, Missouri
Transportation in Ozark County, Missouri